Smigel is a surname. Notable people with the surname include:

 Irwin Smigel (1924–2016), American dentist
 Robert Smigel (born 1960), American actor, writer, and director

See also
 
 Śmigiel (disambiguation)
 Schmiegel (disambiguation)

Polish-language surnames